KFUM Örebro is an YMCA association in Örebro in Sweden, established in 1890. In 1990 the club won the Swedish women's juniors national volleyball championship, and between 1996 and 2001 the club won the Swedish national women's volleyball championship during six seasons in a row.

The men's floorball team played in the Swedish top division during the 1990s.

References 

1890 establishments in Sweden
Sport in Örebro
Swedish floorball teams
Swedish volleyball clubs
Ore
Religious organizations based in Sweden